Phyllis Joyce McClean Punnett (March 17, 1917 – October 12, 2004) was a musician and writer known for writing the lyrics of "Saint Vincent, Land so beautiful", the national anthem of Saint Vincent and the Grenadines, in 1967.

References

1917 births
2004 deaths
Saint Vincent and the Grenadines writers
Saint Vincent and the Grenadines women writers
Saint Vincent and the Grenadines musicians
National anthem writers